Kay Bannerman (11 October 1919 – 31 March 1991) was a British actress and screenwriter.

Biography
Kay Bannerman was born on 11 October 1919 in Hove, Sussex, England. She was the daughter of Captain Robert George Bannerman and Chicot Mowat. Bannerman grew up in Scotland and France. Bannerman trained in the Royal Academy of Dramatic Art. Bannerman performed on stage. She married Nikita Bruce but they divorced in 1945. Bannerman then went on to marry Harold Brooke. Together they wrote a number of screenplays, the best known of which was All for Mary. Bannerman had two daughters with Brooke. Celia, one of their daughters, went on to become an actress. She died 31 March 1991 in Marbella, Spain.

Stage

 Emmanuele in Asmodée (1939)
 Suzanne in Prison Without Bars (1939)
 Sarah in Major Barbara (1939)
 Ann Sheldon in Other People's Houses (1942)
 Mary Jefferson in One Flight Up (1942)
 Raina in Arms and the Man (1943)
 Polina in The Gambler (1945) 
 Diana Temple in High Horse (1946)

Screenplays
 Fit for Heroes (1945)
 The Nest Egg (1952)
 All For Mary (1954)
 The Call of the Dodo (1955)
 Handful of Tansy (1959)
 Don't Tell Father (1962)
 The Snowman (1965)
 She Was Only an Admiral's Daughter (1972) 
 Take Zero (1974)

Sources

External links 
 

1919 births
1991 deaths
20th-century British actresses
20th-century British screenwriters
British women screenwriters
People from Hove
Alumni of RADA